National Highway 547 is a national highway in states of Maharashtra and Madhya Pradesh in India. It is a branch of National Highway 47. It connects two primary national highways, NH47 and NH44.

Route 
NH547 starts in Maharashtra at Saoner - Sausar - Chhindwara - Amarwara - Harrai - terminates at Narsinghpur in Madhya Pradesh.

Junctions  

Terminal with NH 47 near Saoner.

Junction with NH347 near Chhindwara.

Terminal with NH 44 near Narsinghpur.

Toll plaza 
There are three toll plazas located on NH-547.

Jaitpur toll plaza for Amarwara - Narsinghpur stretch.

Jungawani toll plaza for Chindwara  - Amarawara stretch.

Kelwad toll plaza for Saoner - Chindwara stretch.

See also 
List of National Highways in India by highway number

References

External links
NH 547 on OpenStreetMap

National highways in India
National Highways in Madhya Pradesh
National Highways in Maharashtra